Piteå is a locality and the seat of Piteå Municipality in Norrbotten County, Sweden. Piteå is Sweden's 58th largest city, with a population of 23,326.

Geography 
Piteå is located at the mouth of the Pite River, at the shore of the Bay of Bothnia.

Piteå's coastal location, with numerous islands and inlets, is one of the reasons it is a popular place for tourism both in summer and winter. It features a beach resort area called Pite Havsbad, around which there is a spa, a long sandy beach, a restaurant and a golf course. The area is also suitable for fishing and outdoor activities. In the winter, snow activities such as skiing and winter bathing are common. The water temperatures reportedly being Sweden's warmest during three consecutive summers in the 1950s, the beach then became known as "Norrbotten's Riviera".

Climate 
Piteå has a climate that is classified as subarctic climate (Köppen climate classification Dfc), bordering to a humid continental climate (Köppen climate classification Dfb).

History 

Piteå received its city privileges on 12 May 1621. The town was originally situated slightly north of its current location, in present-day Öjebyn. In July 1666, the entire town burnt down, and over the following few years it was rebuilt on Häggholmen, a small island which forms the nucleus of present-day Piteå. In 1721, the new town was burnt down by Russian troops during the Russian Pillage of 1719-1721, and the only building that remained was the church, which is still standing.

The town square, where the town hall is located, has kept its structure from the 17th century. It is one of only two squares in Sweden with closed corners; the other one is in Uppsala.

Piteå's population has increased rapidly since the 19th century. In the years 1870–1920, Piteå had a population of only 2,500 people. Part of the early population increase is attributed to the 1911 opening of the Älvsbyn-Piteå railway branch, as well as industrial establishments and the harbour.

Piteå has traditionally had a strong forestry industry; papermills, sawmills, and its harbour are of some importance.

Culture 
Piteå is known for its pitepalt, a food dish consisting of potato dumplings with chopped pork filling. The area is also known for its dialect, called Pitemål, which however is mainly spoken by elders in surrounding villages.

Piteå has a fast food drive-thru commonly used by snowmobilers.  The restaurant was a McDonald's from February 2002 to November 2007. Several McDonald's restaurants in Norrbotten closed at the time, in the face of competition from Max Hamburgers. The restaurant is now part of the Frasses hamburger chain.  The drive-thru has received international coverage, including on The Travel Channel in an episode called "Most Unique McDonald's".

Piteå has a sister city in the Caribbean: Gustavia, capital of Saint Barthélemy, the formerly Swedish possession that is now part of France.

The School of music of Luleå University of Technology is located in Piteå.

Cleantech
Piteå has emerged as an important center of cleantech production and research based on cellulose byproducts. Chemrec operates a black liquor gasifier and the world's first BioDME production facility, SunPine has pioneered a renewable diesel process technology using crude tall oil as feedstock, and ETC (Energy Technology Centre in Piteå) is a research and development center for renewable fuels with focus on combustion, gasification and biorefining processes.

Sport

The Piteå IF football team is playing in the fourth highest Swedish division, Division 2 for men; and the Piteå IF ladies team is for their first time playing in the highest league in football, Damallsvenskan.

Ice hockey is the big sport in town, even though Piteå HC only plays in the third-highest League (Division I) in Sweden.  The club has provided many good players to the NHL and national team: examples are Tomas Holmström, Mikael Renberg, Mattias Öhlund, Lars Lindgren, Stefan Persson, Jan Sandström and Mats Lavander. Munksund-Skuthamns SK ladies team is, for their first time, playing in the highest league in Hockey, Riksserien. Rebecka Stenberg became the first woman from Piteå to play for the Swedish national team.

In cross-country skiing the town has a successful club called Piteå Elit, with skiers like Lina Andersson, Magdalena Pajala and Charlotte Kalla.

In competitive swimming, the town has a very successful team called Piteå Sim which is famous all over Norrland especially Norrbotten. One of the most famous swimmers in the club is 13-year-old Heidi Nilsson who got first place in the Junior, Senior and Ladies category in the Piteå Kanalsimmet 2018 which takes place every year on Valborgsmässoafton.

Other sports clubs located in Piteå include Storfors AIK, MSSK and the northern paintball team 'Team X-rated'.

People from Piteå 
Christopher Jacob Boström
Nils Edén
Tomas Holmström — NHL player with the Detroit Red Wings
Lars Lindgren — retired former NHL player
Nils Lundqvist — defenseman with the Dallas Stars
Liza Marklund
Peter Mattei — Swedish baritone opera singer
Mattias Öhlund — NHL player with the Vancouver Canucks
Mikael Renberg — retired former NHL player
Anna Magnusson — Swedish biathlete
Daniel Solander — Explorer

International relations

Twin towns – Sister cities
Piteå is twinned with:
 Kandalaksha, Russia
 Grindavík, Iceland
 Gustavia, Saint Barthélemy, France

References

External links 

Official website of Piteå
 Piteå in the 1915 Nordisk familjebok, with images on following page

 
Populated places in Piteå Municipality
Norrbotten
Coastal cities and towns in Sweden
Municipal seats of Norrbotten County
Swedish municipal seats
Populated places established in 1621
1621 establishments in Sweden
Cities in Norrbotten County